Muhammad Abbas, Mohammad Abbas or Mohammed Abbas may refer to:

 Mohammad Abbas (cricketer) (born 1990), Pakistani cricketer
 Mohammad Abbas Abbasi (governor) (1924–1988), Punjab governor
 Mohammad Abbas Akhund, Afghan Taliban politician
 Mohammad Abbas Ansari (born 1936), Kashmiri cleric
 Mohammad Abbas Baig (1917–2008), Pakistani general
 Mohammad Abbas Bhat (died 2018), commander of the Hizbul Mujahideen in Shopian district
 Mohammed Abbas (Emirati footballer) (born 2002)
 Mohammed Abbas (football coach), Egyptian football manager
 Mohammed Abbas (rugby league), Australian-born rugby league player who represented Lebanon
 Mohammed Abbas (squash player) (born 1980), Egyptian squash player
 Mohammed Abbas (swimmer) (born 1978), Iraqi swimmer
 Muhammad I Abu 'l-Abbas (died 856), fifth emir of the Aghlabidss in Ifriqiya
 Muhammad Abbas (Emir of Kano) (died 1919), Nigerian traditional ruler
 Muhammad Abbas (skier) (born 1986), Pakistani alpine skier
 Muhammad Abbas Jafri, Pakistani politician

See also
 Mahmoud Abbas (disambiguation)